Arkady Kudinov (Russian: Аркадий Кудинов; born 27 September 1942) is a Soviet rower from Russia.

Kudinov was born in Vladivostok, Russia. At the 1965 European Rowing Championships in Duisburg, he won silver with the men's eight. At the 1966 World Rowing Championships in Bled, he won silver with the men's eight. He competed at the 1968 Summer Olympics in Mexico City with the men's coxed four where they came sixth. Kudinov rowed in the semi-finals only when he temporarily replaced Boris Duyunov.

References

1942 births
Living people
Soviet male rowers
Olympic rowers of the Soviet Union
Rowers at the 1968 Summer Olympics
Sportspeople from Vladivostok
European Rowing Championships medalists
World Rowing Championships medalists for the Soviet Union